"Look into My Eyes" is Fayray's 16th single. It was released, just a month after "Negai", on March 17, 2004 and peaked at #35.  The song was used as the opening theme for the Yomiuri TV/Nippon TV series drama "Ranpo R" for which she also sang the theme song. The coupling is a cover of Carole Bayer Sager's "Don't Cry Out Loud".

Track listing
Look into My Eyes
Don't Cry Out Loud

Charts 
"Look into My Eyes" - Oricon Sales Chart (Japan)

References

External links
Fayray Official Site

2004 singles
Fayray songs
2004 songs
Songs written by Fayray